Outer Touch (U.S. title Spaced Out, also known as Outer Reach or Outer Spaced) is a 1979 British science fiction sex comedy film directed by Norman J. Warren. It stars Glory Annen, Barry Stokes and Ava Cadell.

Plot
Aliens from Betelgeuse crash-land on Earth in their malfunctioning cargo ship. Their arrival draws the attention of four sexually frustrated humans in a nearby park: Oliver and Prudence (a mild-mannered professional and his highly-strung fiancée), Willy (a bumbling shop assistant) and Cliff (a middle-aged man walking his dog). Oliver, Prudence, Willy and Cliff wander into the ship and encounter its all-female crew: engineer Partha, nurse Cosia and the captain, known as Skipper. Willy inadvertently drops some pornographic magazines that he has just bought. The aliens mistake a herd of approaching cows for a hostile force and hurriedly take off despite the computer's warnings about the fragile state of the ship's systems.

Resuming their original course, the aliens study their guests in detail. Fascinated by the anatomy of the males, they decide to sell them to a zoo for exotic lifeforms on a distant planet. They also debate the significance of the acts depicted in Willy's magazines. Partha is particularly keen to emulate them and enthusiastically has sex with Cliff. However, Cliff soon regrets this decision as he physically cannot keep up with the energetic Partha, who has gained an extreme liking for sex and wants to have it with him non-stop, forcing Cliff to flee the room.

Skipper, Cosia and Partha subject the males to a series of tests to learn more about their abilities. Oliver and Cliff fail miserably, but Willy, searching for his magazines, beats Skipper's combat simulation by unknowingly evading her attacks, causing her to collapse with exhaustion. While conducting a physical examination on Willy, Cosia discovers that his biology is more advanced than anything known to their species. Intriguing Cosia with exaggerated claims about his sexual prowess, Willy loses his virginity to her. Later, he passes an intelligence test by a fluke and has sex with Partha.

In the ship's recreation area, Oliver seeks relationship advice from an artificial intelligence resembling a Wurlitzer jukebox. At the Wurlitzer's suggestion, he adopts a "caveman" approach to seducing Prudence. Shocked by her fiancé's behaviour, Prudence runs to a luxurious bedroom, where she immediately relaxes and willingly has sex with him. Meanwhile, Cliff tries to avoid Partha's advances but ends up getting himself trapped in a chair-like machine that the aliens use for sexual intercourse, which causes him excruciating pain.

Awed by Willy's assumed physical and intellectual superiority, the aliens propose to return the others to Earth but take him with them. Willy is reluctant to leave his planet behind but agrees when Skipper, wanting to confirm Cosia and Partha's findings for herself, allows him to seduce her. The ship touches down safely and Oliver, Prudence and Cliff depart. However, the subsequent launch causes a fatal overload and the ship explodes, killing Willy and the three aliens. The disembodied voices of the computer and the Wurlitzer are left stranded in space.

Cast

Barry Stokes as Oliver
Tony Maiden as Willy
Glory Annen as Cosia
Michael Rowlatt as Cliff
Ava Cadell as Partha
Kate Ferguson as Skipper
Lynne Ross as Prudence
Noel Davis as Computer Voice (UK version)
Jeff de Hart as Computer Voice (US version)
Bill Mitchell as Voice of the Wurlitzer (UK version)
Bob Saget as Voice of the Wurlitzer (US version)

Production

Development
After Loving Feeling (1969), Norman J. Warren had moved away from sex comedies and gone on to direct the horror films Satan's Slave , Prey and Terror. Outer Touch was inspired by Close Encounters of the Third Kind: the original script, presented to Warren by producer David Speechley, was called "S.E.C.K." (Sexual Encounters of the Close Kind). Warren, who found the script "funny but very corny", agreed to direct the film on the condition that he be allowed to revise the story. The title "Outer Touch" is a play on the expression "out of touch". Warren described the film as a cross between a Carry On and Fire Maidens from Outer Space (1956).

Filming
Production began on 22 January 1979 and ran for four weeks. The film was largely shot at Twickenham Studios and Bray Studios with the outdoor opening scenes being filmed on location in Marble Hill Park, Twickenham. The section of spaceship that appears in the park scenes was created with scaffolding covered with plastic sheets. The way in which these scenes were lit was meant as a pastiche of Close Encounters of the Third Kind. The scale model shots of the ship in flight were taken from the TV series Space: 1999. Due to the variety of shots used the appearance of the ship changes over the course of the film. Warren said that Barry Stokes, whom he had first directed in Prey (1977), based his performance partly on Christopher Reeve's portrayal of Clark Kent in Superman (1978).

Release
Warren called the film "dreadful in a nice sort of way".

In the United States, the film was released as Spaced Out by the newly founded Miramax, which re-edited the film to include new voice-overs and music and an upbeat ending. Warren, who was not consulted on these alterations, said the only change he "really liked" was the title, as he thought Outer Touch was "quite negative-sounding".

Critical response
In a contemporary review, John Pym of The Monthly Film Bulletin described the film as a "slap-and-tickle shoestring parody" that "gratifyingly lacks any of the usual directorial knowingness" and whose cast "achieve a kind of capering charm."

TV Guide calls the film "amateurish". Radio Times rates it one star out of five. Review website DVD Drive-In comments: "Just be thankful that this ends well before the 80-minute mark, and that Warren went back to the horror genre." In contrast, The New York Times describes the music as "agreeable, the sex flippant and the dialogue, by Bob Saget, Jeff de Hart and Andrew Payne, fairly funny."

Home video
The film remained unavailable on any home video format until 2008, when the original UK cut (bearing the American title "Spaced Out") was released on DVD by Odeon Entertainment. Prior to its DVD release the film had never been shown on British television.

References

External links

1979 films
1979 comedy films
1979 independent films
1970s science fiction comedy films
1970s sex comedy films
Alien abduction films
British independent films
British science fiction comedy films
British sex comedy films
1970s English-language films
Films about artificial intelligence
Films directed by Norman J. Warren
Films set in England
Films shot in Berkshire
Films shot in London
1970s British films